Fabrice Santoro was the defending champion, but lost in the second round this year.

Àlex Corretja won the tournament, beating Tommy Haas 2–6, 7–6(8–6), 6–1 in the final.

Seeds

Draw

Finals

Top half

Bottom half

References
 Main Draw

1998 ATP Tour